Sphinx centrosinaria is a moth of the family Sphingidae. It is known from Sichuan, Yunnan and Tibet in southern China.

The wingspan is about 76 mm. It is very similar in colour and pattern to Sphinx crassistriga, but larger, the forewing is more elongate and apically pointed.

The larvae probably feed on Pinaceae species.

References

Sphinx (genus)
Moths described in 1998